The 2020–21 season is the Persepolis's 20th season in the Pro League, and their 38th consecutive season in the top division of Iranian Football. They are also competing in the Hazfi Cup, Super Cup and AFC Champions League.

Squad

First team squad

New Contracts

Transfers

In

Out

Technical staff 

|}

Pre-season and friendlies

Competitions

Overview

Persian Gulf Pro League

Results summary

Results by round

League table

Matches

Hazfi Cup

Matches

Super Cup

AFC Champions League

2020 AFC Champions League

Group stage

Matches

Knockout stage

2021 AFC Champions League

Group stage 
Group E

Matches

Statistics

,

|-
! colspan="18" style="background:#dcdcdc; text-align:center"| Players transferred/loaned out during the season

Scorers

Assists

 
* Aghaei provided 3 assists in 2020 ACL, 2 assists provided before the 3rd match of group stage in 2019–20 season for Sepahan.

Goalkeeping

Man of the Match

* Based on Metrica statistics, Statistical and technical reference of Iranian football 
* In ACL based on Asian Football Confederation

Disciplinary record
Includes all competitive matches. Players with 1 card or more are included only.

|}

Club

Kit 

|- style="vertical-align: top;"
|

|

 After the death of Mehrdad Minavand and Ali Ansarian

Sponsorship 

Main sponsor: Tourism Bank
Other sponsors: Irancell
Bonmano coffee
Official shirt manufacturer: Uhlsport

References

External links 
Iran Premier League Statistics
Persian League
Persepolis News

2020-21
Iranian football clubs 2020–21 season